The 2010 Three Days of De Panne was the 34th edition of the Three Days of De Panne cycle race and was held on 30 March to 1 April 2010. The race started in Middelkerke and finished in De Panne. The race was won by David Millar.

General classification

References

Three Days of Bruges–De Panne
2010 in Belgian sport